Shilin is a Chinese given name. Notable people with the name include:

Sun Shilin (born 1988), Chinese football player
Xu Shilin (born 1998), Chinese tennis player
Zhu Shilin (1899–1967), Chinese film director

Chinese given names